TV4 is an Estonian sports channel, formerly owned Kalev Media and named Kalev Sport. Kalev Sport was launched in late 2007, offering viewers various sporting events, both domestic and international. It was renamed into TV4 and changed its owner after Kalev Media's bankruptcy. The new owner of the channel is Toomas Lepp. TV4 shows include English Premier League, motocross, Estonian club football, volleyball, and basketball. They also broadcast some Baltic Basketball league games.

References

Sources
Kalev Sport brings back Premier League

Defunct television channels in Estonia
Sports television networks
Television channels and stations established in 2007
Television channels and stations disestablished in 2009
2007 establishments in Estonia
2009 disestablishments in Estonia
Mass media in Tallinn